Jennings Lake is a narrow meltwater lake,  long, at the foot of Jennings Promontory on the eastern margin of the Amery Ice Shelf, Antarctica. It was delineated by John H. Roscoe in 1952 from aerial photographs taken by U.S. Navy Operation Highjump (1946–47), and named by him in association with Jennings Promontory.

References

Lakes of Antarctica
Bodies of water of Mac. Robertson Land
Ingrid Christensen Coast